Glenn College is an Australian secular residential college located on the grounds of La Trobe University's principal campus in Melbourne, Victoria. Founded in 1967, it is the first and oldest residential college at the university. The college is named after the founding Chancellor of La Trobe University, Sir Archibald Glenn.

There are up to 344 students residing at Glenn College with the majority of residents being undergraduates. Residents of the college are known as "Glennies".

History
The construction of Glenn College finished in early 1967 in preparation for the university's first students that would enrol in March that year. Due to the fragility of the 'college concept' that its founders espoused, Glenn College came to be the first and last college of the university that had entirely met the original intentions of the Colleges Committee.

In the early years, the college served as a central part of university life. 
The council of the university held its first meeting on 19 December 1966 in the council room of Glenn College, where Sir Archibald Glenn, who the college had already been named after, was elected as chancellor. On the evening of 8 March 1967, the day on which the university was officially opened, the council held an inaugural ball at Glenn College.

Culture and academic life

Heraldry

The design of the coat of arms is an amalgamation of the La Trobe University coat of arms and the armorial bearings of the family of Sir Archibald Glenn, first Chancellor of the University.

The official description of the Glenn College armorial bearings is as follows:
Gyronny of eight Sable and Gules a Mullet of eight points voided and encircled by eight Escallops flukes inward Argent and for the Crest upon a Helm with a Wreath Argent and Gules A White-breasted Sea-Eagle wings elevated and addorsed proper grasping in the dexter talons from underneath an Escallop Argent Mantled Gules doubled Argent.

The college motto, "Learning to live, Living to learn", is inscribed on the scroll beneath the shield. This motto was chosen by the college's general committee as it encompasses the academic, social and cultural values upon which the college ethos is built.

Facilities

Sports
Each year, Glenn College competes for the highly coveted Chancellor's Trophy with the other La Trobe University Melbourne colleges - Menzies College and Chisholm College (whose side also consists of residents from Barnes way, Graduate House and  University Lodge). The intercollegiate sports are held throughout the university year and include cricket, hockey, swimming, tennis, Australian rules football, softball, baseball, badminton, netball, touch football, squash, volleyball, basketball, table tennis, billiards and the Ring Road Relay.

Academic honours

Wardens

Heads of College 
 Ben Meredith, 1967-1970
 D. Elwyn Davies, 1970 (acting head)
 John G. Jenkin, 1970-1971
 Stan Oates, 1971-1980
 Richard Luke, 1980-19--

Notes

References

La Trobe University
Residential colleges of Australian universities
Buildings and structures in the City of Darebin
1967 establishments in Australia